Paloma Isabel Schmidt Gutiérrez (born 24 January 1987 in Lima) is a Peruvian sports sailor.

At the 2008 and 2012 Summer Olympics, she competed in the Women's Laser Radial class, finishing in 26th and 39th place respectively.

Notes

References

External links
 
 
 Paloma Schmidt at Olympic.org (archived)
 
 

1987 births
Living people
Peruvian female sailors (sport)
Olympic sailors of Peru
Sailors at the 2008 Summer Olympics – Laser Radial
Sailors at the 2012 Summer Olympics – Laser Radial
Sailors at the 2016 Summer Olympics – Laser Radial
Sailors at the 2015 Pan American Games
People from Lima
Pan American Games competitors for Peru
Sailors at the 2020 Summer Olympics – Laser Radial